is a passenger railway station  located in the city of Amagasaki Hyōgo Prefecture, Japan. It is operated by the private transportation company Hankyu Railway. Although technically situated in Amagasaki, it is a five-minute walk to neighboring Osaka Prefecture.

Lines

Layout
The station consists of two elevated island platforms serving four tracks and a single unnumbered side platform outside the inbound siding track. Normally, only the island platform is used, and the single platform is a 'temporary platform' for getting off, which was mainly used when the Sonoda horse race is held.

Platforms

History
Sonoda Station opened on 20 October 1936.

The station was transformed from a surface-level station to an elevated station in 1980. Work took 2 years to complete.

Station numbering was introduced on 21 December 2013, with Sonoda being designated as station number HK-05.

Passenger statistics
In fiscal 2019, the station was used by an average of 38,241 passengers daily

Surrounding area
Below the station itself exists a small shopping centre called Sonoda Hankyu Plaza (園田阪急プラザ) which undertook a major renovation completed at the end of April 2006. It now consists of many restaurants, a Matsumoto Kiyoshi pharmacy, a Mister Donut, a branch of the Kohyo chain of supermarket, a Docomo mobile phone shop as well as various smaller retailers.

Sonoda Racecourse
Yuri Gakuin Junior and Senior High School
Amagasaki Municipal Sonoda Higashi Junior High School

See also
List of railway stations in Japan

References

External links

Sonoda Station (Hankyu Railway) 

Railway stations in Hyōgo Prefecture
Hankyū Kōbe Main Line
Stations of Hankyu Railway
Railway stations in Japan opened in 1936
Amagasaki